Swing Vote may refer to:

 Swing vote, a vote that may go to any of a number of candidates in an election
 Swing Vote (1999 film), directed by David Anspaugh
 Swing Vote (2008 film), directed by Joshua Michael Stern
 "Swing Vote", a Parks and Recreation season 5 episode